Rhodobacter sphaeroides is a kind of purple bacterium; a group of bacteria that can obtain energy through photosynthesis. Its best growth conditions are anaerobic phototrophy (photoheterotrophic and photoautotrophic) and aerobic chemoheterotrophy in the absence of light. R. sphaeroides is also able to fix nitrogen. It is remarkably metabolically diverse, as it is able to grow heterotrophically via fermentation and aerobic and anaerobic respiration. Such a metabolic versatility has motivated the investigation of R. sphaeroides as a microbial cell factory for biotechnological applications.

Rhodobacter sphaeroides has been isolated from deep lakes and stagnant waters.

Rhodobacter sphaeroides is one of the most pivotal organisms in the study of bacterial photosynthesis.  It requires no unusual conditions for growth and is incredibly efficient.  The regulation of its photosynthetic machinery is of great interest to researchers, as  R. sphaeroides has an intricate system for sensing O2 tensions.  Also, when exposed to a reduction in the partial pressure of oxygen, R. sphaeroides develops invaginations in its cellular membrane.  The photosynthetic apparatus is housed in these invaginations. These invaginations are also known as chromatophores.

The genome of R. sphaeroides is also somewhat intriguing.  It has two chromosomes, one of 3 Mb (CI) and one of 900 Kb (CII), and five naturally occurring plasmids.  Many genes are duplicated between the two chromosomes but appear to be differentially regulated.  Moreover, many of the open reading frames (ORFs) on CII seem to code for proteins of unknown function.  When genes of unknown function on CII are disrupted,  many types of auxotrophy result, emphasizing that the CII is not merely a truncated version of CI.

Small non-coding RNA 

Bacterial small RNAs have been identified as components of many regulatory networks. Twenty sRNAs were experimentally identified in Rhodobacter spheroids, and the abundant ones were shown to be affected by singlet oxygen (1O2)  exposure. 1O2 which generates photooxidative stress, is made by bacteriochlorophyll upon exposure to oxygen and light. One of the 1O2  induced sRNAs SorY (1O2  resistance RNA Y) was shown to be induced under several stress conditions and conferred resistance against 1O2  by affecting a metabolite transporter. SorX is the second  1O2  induced sRNA that counteracts oxidative stress by targeting mRNA for a transporter. It also has an impact on resistance against organic hydroperoxides. A cluster of four homologous sRNAs called CcsR for conserved CCUCCUCCC motif stress-induced RNA has been shown to play a role in photo-oxidative stress resistance as well.  PcrZ (photosynthesis control RNA Z) identified in R. sphaeroides, is a trans-acting sRNA which counteracts the redox-dependent induction of photosynthesis genes, mediated by protein regulators.

Metabolism 
R. sphaeroides encodes several terminal oxidases which allow electron transfer to oxygen and other electron acceptors (e.g. DMSO or TMAO). Therefore, this microorganism can respire under oxic, micro-oxic and anoxic conditions under both light and dark conditions.
Moreover, it is capable to accept a variety of carbon substrates, including C1 to C4 molecules, sugars and fatty acids. Several pathways for glucose catabolism are present in its genome, such as the Embden–Meyerhof–Parnas pathway (EMP), the Entner–Doudoroff pathway (ED) and the Pentose phosphate pathway (PP). The ED pathway is the predominant glycolytic pathway in this microorganism, whereas the EMP pathway contributing only to a smaller extent. Variation in nutrient availability has important effects on the physiology of this bacterium. For example, decrease in oxygen tensions activates the synthesis of photosynthetic machinery (including photosystems, antenna complexes and pigments). Moreover, depletion of nitrogen in the medium triggers intracellular accumulation of polyhydroxybutyrate, a reserve polymer.

Biotechnological applications 
A genome-scale metabolic model exists for this microorganism, which can be used for predicting the effect of gene manipulations on its metabolic fluxes. For facilitating genome editing in this species, a CRISPR/Cas9 genome editing tool was developed and expanded. Moreover, partitioning of intracellular fluxes has been studied in detail, also with the help of 13C-glucose isotopomers. Altogether, these tools can be employed for improving R. sphaeroides as cell factory for industrial biotechnology.

Knowledge of the physiology of R. sphaeroides allowed the development of biotechnological processes for the production of some endogenous compounds. These are hydrogen, polyhydroxybutyrate and isoprenoids (e.g. coenzyme Q10 and carotenoids). Moreover, this microorganism is used also for wastewater treatment. Hydrogen evolution occurs via the activity of the enzyme nitrogenase, whereas isoprenoids are synthesized naturally via the endogenous MEP pathway. The native pathway has been optimized via genetic engineering for improving coenzyme Q10 synthesis. Alternatively, improvement of isoprenoid synthesis was obtained via the introduction of a heterologous mevalonate pathway.

Synonyms 
 Rhodococcus minor Molisch 1907
 Rhodococcus capsulatus Molisch 1907
 Rhodosphaera capsulata (Molisch) Buchanan 1918
 Rhodosphaera minor (Molisch) Bergey et al. 1923
 Rhodorrhagus minor (Molisch) Bergey et al. 1925
 Rhodorrhagus capsulatus (Molisch) Bergey et al. 1925
 Rhodorrhagus capsulatus Bergey et al. 1939
 Rhodopseudomonas sphaeroides van Niel 1944
 Rhodopseudomonas spheroides van Niel 1944
 Rhodorrhagus spheroides (van Niel) Brisou 1955

Reclassification 
In 2020 it was recommended that Rhodobacter sphaeroides be moved to the genus Cereibacter. This is the name currently used by the NCBI taxonomy database.

References

Bibliography
 Inomata Tsuyako, Higuchi Masataka (1976), Incorporation of tritium into cell materials of Rhodpseudomonas spheroides from tritiated water in the medium under aerobic conditions ; Journal of Biochemistry 80(3), p569-578, 1976-09

External links 
Video recordings van R. sphaeroides
Type strain of Rhodobacter sphaeroides at BacDive -  the Bacterial Diversity Metadatabase

Phototrophic bacteria
Rhodobacteraceae
Bacteria described in 1944